Tiflis may refer to:

 A former official exonym of Tbilisi, Georgia
 Tiflis Governorate, a province of the Russian Empire
 753 Tiflis, a minor planet orbiting the Sun